Unleashed Memories is the second studio album by Italian gothic metal band Lacuna Coil. The album was released 20 March 2001 through Century Media Records and is the first release to feature the classic lineup as Marco Biazzi joined the band. American releases append the Halflife EP to this album.

Track listing

Reissue enhanced CD content
 Photo gallery and Wallpapers

Charts

Personnel

Band members
 Andrea Ferro - male vocals
 Cristina Scabbia - female vocals
 Marco "Maus" Biazzi - lead guitar
 Cristiano "Pizza" Migliore - rhythm guitar
 Marco Coti Zelati - bass, keyboards
 Cristiano "CriZ" Mozzati - drums, percussion

Production
 Waldemar Sorychta - production, engineering, mixing
 Matthias Klinkmann, Siggi Bemm - engineering
 Carsten Drescher - layout design
 Volker Beushausen - photography

References

Lacuna Coil albums
Century Media Records albums
2001 albums
Albums produced by Waldemar Sorychta
Italian-language albums